Everythang's Corrupt is the tenth studio album by American rapper Ice Cube, released on December 7, 2018, by Lench Mob and Interscope Records. It is his first studio album since 2010's I Am the West and was originally set for release in 2015.

Singles 
The album's first single, "Everythang's Corrupt", was released to YouTube on October 31, 2012, then to digital retailers as a single on January 1, 2013. The album's second single, "Arrest the President", was released on November 9, 2018.
The third single, "That New Funkadelic", was released on December 4, 2018.

Commercial performance
Everythang's Corrupt debuted at number 62 on the Billboard 200 with 14,000 album-equivalent units of which 8,000 were pure album sales.

Critical reception

The album received generally positive reviews, with critics praising Ice Cube's lyrical delivery. At Metacritic, which assigns a normalized rating out of 100 to reviews from mainstream publications, the album received an average score of 79, based on 5 reviews. Michael Pementel of Consequence of Sound said, "Cube still embarks with this same purpose, and the effort proves to be one of the best albums in the latter half of his career". Kyle Mullin of Exclaim! praised the album stating, "Cube's vigorous delivery puts the album over, along with his willingness to adopt flows you wouldn't expect from an MC so long in the tooth".

Track listing
Credits adapted from Tidal.

In addition, "Sic Them Youngins on 'Em" and "Drop Girl" (both released in 2014) were originally planned to appear on the album, but this was abandoned when its release date was changed from 2015 to 2018.

Charts

References

External links

2018 albums
Ice Cube albums
Interscope Records albums
Albums produced by DJ Pooh
Albums produced by Fredwreck